Paul Hopkins may refer to:
 Paul Hopkins (baseball) (1904–2004), right-handed relief pitcher in Major League Baseball
 Paul Hopkins (actor) (born 1968), Canadian television, film and theatre actor
 Paul Hopkins (footballer) (born 1986), English former footballer
 Paul Hopkins (pilot) (1951–2014), chief test pilot of British Aerospace in the late 1990s